Quong Wing v R is a famous Supreme Court of Canada decision where the Court upheld a provincial law that discriminated against the Chinese.

Quong Wing was a naturalized Canadian citizen, originally from China, who ran a restaurant in Moose Jaw, Saskatchewan. In 1912, he attempted to hire two white women, Mabel Hopham and Nellie Lane, to work as waitresses.  Consequently, he was charged and convicted under a provincial statute, An Act to prevent the Employment of Female Labour in certain capacities, which prohibited white women or girls from working in businesses owned by "Chinamen".

Wing appealed, arguing that the law was outside the power of the province as laws related to morality were considered criminal matters which is the exclusive authority of the federal government. As well, he argued that the law did not intend to include naturalized citizens.

The Supreme Court held in a four to one decision that the law was valid. The Court interpreted the word "Chinaman" as including all those born in China regardless of subsequent nationality.

Justice John Idington, alone in dissent, was the only one concerned with the justification of the law and held the law to be invalid on the basis that citizenship was a matter of federal jurisdiction and so ultra vires of provincial powers.

See also
 Christie v. York  [1940] SCR 139
 Noble v. Alley [1951] S.C.R. 64

References

External links
 case summary
 text from decision

Canadian civil rights case law
Supreme Court of Canada cases
1914 in Canadian case law
Chinese Canadian
Minority rights
History of Chinese Canadians